In musical composition, developing variation is a formal technique in which the concepts of development and variation are united in that variations are produced through the development of existing material.

The term was coined by Arnold Schoenberg, twentieth-century composer and inventor of the twelve-tone technique, who believed it was one of the most important compositional principles since around 1750:

Schoenberg distinguished this from the "unravelling" procedures of contrapuntal tonal music but developing variation may be related to other textures and to Schoenberg's own freely atonal pieces which employ a "method of atonal developing variation each chord, line, and harmony results from the subtle alteration and recombination of musical ideas from earlier in the piece" and Schoenberg describes its importance to his development of serialism.

Haimo applies the concept to vertical (pitch) as well as horizontal (rhythm and permutation) transformations in twelve-tone music on the premise of "the 'unity of musical space after suggesting that Schoenberg reconciled serial organization and developing variation in the twelve-tone technique.

References

Further reading
Frisch, Walter (1984). Brahms and the Principle of Developing Variation, p. 1-34. Berkeley. Cited in Haimo as developing from Schoenberg's work.

Variation (music)
Musical development